Pousette-Dart Band 3 is the third album by the American rock band Pousette-Dart Band, released in 1978. It drew a mostly positive review from Joe Viglione of Allmusic, who gave it 3 stars. "Out of the four albums released by the Pousette-Dart Band on Capitol," he said, "Pousette-Dart Band 3 may be the most satisfying." Viglione noted Buffalo Springfield as an influence and considered the album's second side "extraordinary." He said it was "an album that truly deserves a better fate than obscurity."

Track listing
All songs by Jon Pousette-Dart, except where listed.
"Next To You" – 4:24   
"Stand By Me" (Ben E. King, Jerry Leiber, Mike Stoller) – 3:40 
"Love Is My Belief" (John Curtis) – 4:56 
"I Stayed Away Too Long" (Don Covay) – 3:52 
"Where Are You Going" – 2:32 
"Louisiana" – 6:07   
"Too Blue to Be True" – 3:45   
"Mr. Saturday Night" – 4:55   
"Lord's Song" – 5:05

Personnel

Pousette-Dart Band
Jon Pousette: Guitars (Acoustic, Electric and Slide), Vocals (all tracks)
John G. Curtis: Mandolin, Guitars (all tracks except 5)
John Troy: Bass (all tracks except 5)
Michael Dawe: Drums, Percussion (all tracks except 5)

Additional Personnel
Norman Pride, Hank Medress: Percussion
Stan Schwartz: Keyboards
Dave Appell: String Arrangement on track 9

Chart positions

References

1978 albums
Pousette-Dart Band albums
Capitol Records albums